Praprotno Brdo is a small settlement above Rovte in the Municipality of Logatec in the Inner Carniola region of Slovenia.

The local church is dedicated to Saint Nicholas and belongs to the Parish of Rovte.

References

External links
Praprotno Brdo on Geopedia

Populated places in the Municipality of Logatec